Alphonse Anger (20 August 1915 – 22 October 1999) was a French gymnast. He competed in eight events at the 1948 Summer Olympics.

References

External links

1915 births
1999 deaths
French male artistic gymnasts
Olympic gymnasts of France
Gymnasts at the 1948 Summer Olympics
Sportspeople from Haut-Rhin
20th-century French people